Fred Richards may refer to:

 Frederic M. Richards (1925–2009), professor of molecular biophysics and biochemistry at Yale University
 Fred Richards (baseball) (1927–2016), American baseball player
 Frederick Richards (1833–1912), admiral of the fleet
 Frederick Richards (film editor) (1903–1949), American film editor
 Frederick Richards (judge) (1869–1957), Australian jurist

See also
 Fred Richard (born 2004), American artistic gymnast